Thailand participated in the 2006 Asian Games held in Doha, Qatar from 1–15 December 2006.
Thailand ended the games at 54 overall medals including 13 gold medals.

Medalists

References

Nations at the 2006 Asian Games
2006
Asian Games